Phantom Thread is a 2017 American period drama film written and directed by Paul Thomas Anderson. It is about the complex relationship between a dressmaker (played by Daniel Day-Lewis) and his muse (played by Vicky Krieps). Phantom Thread began a limited release on December 25, 2017 in the United States, before expanding wide on January 19, 2018. It is reportedly Day-Lewis's final performance in a film before retiring.

On review aggregator website Rotten Tomatoes, the film has an approval rating of 91% based on 317 reviews. On Metacritic, which assigns a normalized rating to reviews, the film has a weighted average score of 90 out of 100, based on 51 critics, indicating "universal acclaim."

Phantom Thread was praised for the performances of Day-Lewis and Lesley Manville, Anderson's direction and screenplay, Jonny Greenwood's score, and Mark Bridges' costume design. At the 90th Academy Awards, the film received six nominations; Best Picture, Best Director for Anderson, Best Actor for Day-Lewis, Best Supporting Actress for Manville, and Best Original Score for Greenwood, winning Best Costume Design for Bridges. They were the first Academy Award nominations for Manville and Greenwood. At the 23rd Critics' Choice Awards, it received four nominations, winning Best Costume Design for Bridges. The National Board of Review listed Phantom Thread as one of the top ten films of the year, and awarded Anderson the award for Best Original Screenplay.

Accolades

Notes

References

External links 
 

Lists of accolades by film